Move Along is the second studio album by the American rock band the All-American Rejects, released on July 12, 2005, by Interscope Records. It spawned three top 15 singles, which helped the album ship 2 million units to be certified double platinum by the RIAA.

Production
The All-American Rejects began writing new material for their second album in the fall of 2003, with the song "Dance Inside" being the first written and performed by the band during their then-current tour. After the end of their tour, the band's songwriters Tyson Ritter and Nick Wheeler spent the majority of 2004 writing more new material in their homes in Destin, Florida.

Production for the album took place in Burbank, California the following December, taking a majority of seven weeks to record. Sessions were held at Bay 7 Studios in Valley Village, California, and Sparky Dar k Studio in Calabasas, California; strings were recorded by Casey Stone at Sunset Sound in Hollywood, California. Howard Benson acted as producer, with recording being handled by Mike Plotnikoff. Hatsukazu Inagaki was the assistant engineer, with Paul Decarli doing Pro Tools editing. The songs recorded were then mixed in March 2005 by Chris Lord-Alge at Resonate Music in Burbank. Ted Jensen mastered the album at Sterling Sound in New York City.

Release
Between March and May 2005, the All-American Rejects embarked on a headlining US tour; the first half of it was supported by Number One Fan and Action Action, while Armor for Sleep and Hellogoodbye featured on the second half. The trek also included an appearance at that year's The Bamboozle festival. The album's lead single "Dirty Little Secret" was released June 6, 2005. A music video followed its release on July 11. The band appeared on the 2005 Warped Tour in June and July; around this time, they were accompanied by touring keyboardist Tim Jordan. Move Along was made available for streaming on July 10, 2005, before being released two days later through DGC, Doghouse, and Interscope.

The music video for "Move Along" was posted on MTV's website on January 12, 2006, which was directed by Marc Webb. It was released as the second single on February 27, 2006, but did not chart until the following summer. From March to May 2006, the group toured with Fall Out Boy on their North American arena tour, titled the Black Clouds and Underdogs Tour. Preceded by another appearance at The Bamboozle festival, the band went on a tour of North America in June and July 2006, with support from Damone. The band were forced to cancel the Canadian dates of this tour due to Ritter having vocal issues.

Also in July, "Top of the World" was released as a promotional single in the United States; a music video made up of videos and photographs taken by the band while on tour was released to help promote it.  A music video was released for "It Ends Tonight" on August 28. In September, the band went on a tour of the UK. On September 19, "It Ends Tonight" was released as the final single from Move Along. In October, went on a tour of American colleges with support from Ima Robot. For the majority of October 2006, the band went on a US West Coast tour with support from Ima Robot. From late October to mid December, the band went on the Tournado 2006 tour with support from the Format, Gym Class Heroes, the Starting Line and Motion City Soundtrack. On January 16, 2007, the band appeared on The Tonight Show with Jay Leno. They released their second video album, Tournado, consisting of footage from the tour of the same name, in July 2007.

Reception

Critical reception
Move Along received positive reviews from music critics. Blender rated the album 3 out of 5 stars whilst  Entertainment Weekly scored it a B+.

AbsolutePunk gave the album a 71% positive rating, reviewing with "The All-American Rejects have opted for a more direct rock and roll sound by somewhat changing their instrumentation and abandoning what made them so fun in the first place. Nevertheless, the band does sound very good: singer Tyson Ritter sounds better than ever, both in terms of melody as well in clarity of delivery, and the ridiculous production allows for each of the countless layers of guitars to shine through the extremely clear, yet thick sounding drums", while AllMusic commented "The All-American Rejects' effervescent 2003 hit "Swing Swing" sounded like a pop-punk adaptation of Better Than Ezra, and their sophomore effort makes this mix even more apparent", and that "The Rejects rock out a little on "Night Drive", "Dirty Little Secret", and "I'm Waiting"; the guitars crackle anxiously, and Tyson Ritter and Nick Wheeler's breathy harmonies soar like they mean it.

antiMusic gave it a score of 4.5 out of 5 stars and said, "These guys have got the art of the hook down so well that you have no choice but to submit to their wills."

IGN reviewed Move Along saying "[The album] is made for the masses, with each song as sexed up for the radio as the next. Full of isolation, break ups, and other run-of-the-mill pop topics, Move Along never really questions straying from the path." Prefix Magazine gave it a score of six out of ten, regarding the lyrics "too feel-good to be effective or memorable", but praised the track "11:11 P.M." as a "fast-moving song about last mistakes and other inoffensive high school diary entries, comes complete with fist-pumping chorus and ticking-clock sound effects."

Commercial performance and accolades
Move Along debuted at No. 6 on the US Billboard 200 with 90,000 first week sales. It spent 84 weeks inside the top 100 of the chart. The album was later certified 2× Platinum by the Recording Industry Association of America for the shipment of 2 million copies. "Dirty Little Secret" peaked at #9 on the Billboard Hot 100 in the United States as well as #4 on both the Pop 100 and Mainstream Top 40 charts respectively. "Move Along" charted at #15 on the Billboard Hot 100 and the top 10 on the Hot Canadian Digital Singles Chart,  "It Ends Tonight" reached a peak position of #8 on both the US Billboard Hot 100 and Mainstream Top 40. By August 2006, the album had sold over 2,300,000 copies.

Cleveland.com ranked "Dirty Little Secret" at number 40 on their list of the top 100 pop-punk songs. Alternative Press ranked "Dirty Little Secret" at number 68 and "Move Along" at number 25 on their list of the best 100 singles from the 2000s.

Track listing
All songs written by Tyson Ritter and Nick Wheeler.

Personnel
Personnel per booklet.

The All-American Rejects
 Tyson Ritter – lead vocals, bass, backing vocals, theremin (track 2)
 Nick Wheeler – guitars, keyboards, programming, banjo (track 6), electric sitar (track 6), classical guitar (track 9)
 Mike Kennerty – guitars
 Chris Gaylor – drums, additional percussion

Additional musicians
 Howard Benson – keyboards, programming, claps (track 6), stomps (track 6)
 Paul Decarli – keyboards, programming
 Deborah Lurie – string arranger, conductor
 Lenny Castro – percussion
 Jamie Muhoberac – piano (tracks 3, 4, 10 and 12)
 Bobbi Page – choir (track 3)
 Benjamin Byram – choir (track 3)
 Nicolas Harper – choir (track 3)
 Emily Logan – choir (track 3)
 Michael Mayo – choir (track 3)
 Zoe Merrill – choir (track 3)
 Haeley Moore – choir (track 3)
 Aaron Page – choir (track 3)
 The All-American Rejects – gang vocals (track 6), claps (track 6), stomps (track 6)
 Chris Allen – claps (track 6), stomps (track 6)
 Keith Nelson – claps (track 6), stomps (track 6)
 Dee Anderson – claps (track 6), stomps (track 6)

Production and design
 Howard Benson – producer
 Mike Plotnikoff – recording
 Chris Lord-Alge – mixing
 Hatsukazu Inagaki – assistant engineer
 Paul Decarli – Pro Tools editing
 Casey Stone – strings recording
 Ted Jensen – mastering
 Chris Bilheimer – art direction
 Chapman Baehlerlol – photography

Charts and certifications

Weekly charts

Year-end charts

Certifications

Release history

References
 Citations

Sources

External links

 Move Along at YouTube (streamed copy where licensed)

The All-American Rejects albums
2005 albums
Albums produced by Howard Benson
Interscope Records albums
Interscope Geffen A&M Records albums